This is a list of commercial banks in São Tomé and Príncipe

 Afriland First Bank
 Banco Equador
 Banco Internacional de São Tomé e Príncipe
 Commercial Bank of São Tomé and Príncipe
 Energy Bank - A subsidiary of Global Fleet Group

See also
 List of banks in Africa
 Central Bank of São Tomé and Príncipe
 Economy of São Tomé and Príncipe

References

External links
 Website of Banco Central  de São Tomé e Príncipe (Portuguese)

 
Banks
Sao Tome and Principe
Sao Tome and Principe